Cree Lake (Crystal Lodge) Water Aerodrome  is located adjacent to Crystal Lodge, a fly-in fishing lodge on Cree Lake, Saskatchewan, Canada. The airport is located alongside Cree Lake/Crystal Lodge (Midgett Field) Aerodrome on Ispatinow Island, the largest island in the lake.

See also 
List of airports in Saskatchewan

References

Registered aerodromes in Saskatchewan
Seaplane bases in Saskatchewan